Oldham Street is in Manchester city centre and forms part of the city's historic Northern Quarter district. The Northern Quarter is dominated by buildings that were built before World War II.

The street runs from Piccadilly to Great Ancoats Street on the edge of Ancoats, beyond which it continues northwards as Oldham Road, the A62. The street is part of Manchester which is on a tentative list as a UNESCO World Heritage Site.

The Methodist Central Hall stands on the east side.

Until the 1970s Oldham Street formed one of the principal shopping areas of Manchester city centre. However the construction of the large indoor Arndale Centre during this decade to the west saw most of the well known and long established high street stores close or relocated.

Shopping
At the Ancoats end of the street is the Frog and Bucket Comedy Club. Further down is the independent music venue The Night and Day Café and Dry Bar. A little further along is Afflecks, catering for alternative and individualised fashions. There are retro/vintage clothing stores on the street.

In addition to Oldham Street's alternative fashion outlets, it is known for second hand music shops specialising in collectible and new vinyl, ranging from rhythm & blues, soul and folk to Madchester, techno, drum & bass and dubstep.

See also
Manchester and Salford Wesleyan Methodist Mission

References

Streets in Manchester
Shopping streets in Manchester